Lom nad Rimavicou is a village and municipality in Brezno District, in the Banská Bystrica Region of central Slovakia. The approximate latitude is 48.65 and longitude is 19.65. It is one of the highest located villages in Slovakia.
The village was originally settled by Gorals. Neighbouring ski areal starts to attract the tourists.

References

External links
http://www.e-obce.sk/obec/lomnadrimavicou/lom-nad-rimavicou.html

Villages and municipalities in Brezno District